Praseodymium fluoride may refer to:

 Praseodymium(III) fluoride (Praseodymium trifluoride), PrF3
 Praseodymium(IV) fluoride (Praseodymium tetrafluoride), PrF4